Taqi Nazeer is a Scottish born actor.

Early life
Nazeer was born in Edinburgh, Scotland. He attended George Heriot's School and went on to study at Heriot-Watt University, where he obtained a Master of Arts in Marketing. Soon after, Nazeer was accepted on a one-year traineeship at BBC Scotland where he was trained in TV and radio presenting. Nazeer attended The Royal Scottish Academy of Music and Drama.

Career
Nazeer received his first professional role whilst still in his final year at The Royal Scottish Academy of Music and Drama. Nazeer was chosen to play overly confident boxer Ajay Chopra in the Fringe First production of Beautiful Burnout, a co-production between The National Theatre of Scotland and the theatre company Frantic Assembly. In preparation, Nazeer trained for eight months with championship boxers and MMA fighters.

Theatre credits
The Deranged Marriage, Rifco Arts (2015) – Mahesh
Beautiful Burnout (2010/11) – Ajay Chopra
Black Snow, (2010) – Ivan Vasilyevich
Words are Never Wasted, Scottish Tour (2009) – Michael
Heer Ranjha, The Tramway Theatre (2008) – Ranjha
Detainee A, The Arches (2007) – Yusef

References

External links
Taqi Nazeer talks about Beautiful Burnout
Taqi Nazeer talks about his first time at the Academy
Blood and Sweat
A Journey from Finance to Romance

Living people
Scottish male stage actors
Male actors from Edinburgh
People educated at George Heriot's School
Alumni of the Royal Conservatoire of Scotland
Year of birth missing (living people)